Leuropharus lasiops, or the acned snake-eel, is a species of eel in the family Ophichthidae. It is the only member of its genus. It is found only in the Pacific Ocean off the coast of Mexico.

References

Ophichthidae
Fish described in 1970